Melissa Dupré (born 5 November 1986) is a Belgian track and field athlete who competes in the javelin throw.

Dupré is one of the most decorated Belgian athletes winning nine gold medals and a total of eleven medals total in the Belgian Athletics Championships. She has also represented Belgium in numerous international competitions including European Team Championships, Summer Universiade, European Cup and the Youth Summer Olympics.

Dupré has advanced to the finals in many international competition, however she has never finished on the podium. Dupré’s highest finish was 4th and finished 5th twice in the European Cup and Championships.

Competition results
 Belgian Athletics Championships

 International results 
Representing  in women's javelin throw

References

External links

 

1986 births
Living people
Competitors at the 2009 Summer Universiade
Competitors at the 2011 Summer Universiade